The following is a list of events and releases that happened in 2020 in African music.

Events
18 March - It is announced that Cameroonian musician Manu Dibango has tested positive for coronavirus.
21 March - The Tenor Foundation for Culture launches an initiative, in collaboration with the Moroccan Philharmonic Orchestra (OPM), the International School of Music and Dance (EIDM), and the Mazaya Sociocultural Program, to stream live concerts to viewers in Morocco.
30 June - Ethiopia's internet is taken down by the government amid unrest brought about by the shooting of musician and political activist Hachalu Hundessa.

Albums released in 2020

Classical
Michael Blake 
Mémoriale, for large symphony orchestra
Nattlige Toner/Night Music (film score, arranged for violin and harp)

Musical films
LOUD, starring Sophie Alakija and Eucharia Anunobi
Lady Buckit and the Motley Mopsters (animation), with music by DJ Klem and Ava Momoh

Deaths
January 19 - Allah Thérèse, age unknown, Ivorian traditional singer
February 1 - Kofi B, age unknown, Ghanaian highlife musician (heart attack)
February 9 - Abdel Aziz El Mubarak, 69, Sudanese singer (pneumonia)
February 11 - Joseph Shabalala, 78, South African musician (Ladysmith Black Mambazo).
February 12 - Victor Olaiya, 89, Nigerian highlife trumpeter
February 15 - Prince Kudakwashe Musarurwa, 31, Zimbabwean Afro Jazz singer, songwriter, producer and musician
February 16 - Erickson Le Zulu, 41 Ivorian disc jockey and singer
February 17 - Kizito Mihigo, 38, Rwandan gospel singer.
March 18 - Kenneth Kafui, age unknown, Ghanaian composer
March 19 - Aurlus Mabélé, 66, Congolese singer and composer, the "King of Soukous"
March 24 - Manu Dibango, 86, Cameroonian musician and saxophonist (COVID-19)
April 5 - DJ Miller (Virgile Karuranga), 29, Rwandan DJ and musician (stroke)
April 7 - Hudeydi, 91, Somali musician
April 14 
Akin Euba, 84, Nigerian composer, musicologist, and pianist
Kasongo wa Kanema, 73, Congolese musician (Orchestra Super Mazembe).
April 30 – Tony Allen, 79, Nigerian drummer, composer and songwriter (abdominal aortic aneurysm)
May 22 – Mory Kanté, 70, Guinean singer and musician
June 1 – Majek Fashek, 57, Nigerian reggae singer and songwriter
June 12 
Dodo Doris, 71, Congolese musician (Orchestra Super Mazembe)
Claude Ndam, 65, Cameroonian singer-songwriter
June 14 – Mama Nguéa, 60, Cameroonian singer (diabetes)
June 15
Omondi Long'lilo, 37, Kenyan Benga musician (cancer)
Nana Tuffour, 66, Ghanaian highlife singer
June 29 – Hachalu Hundessa, 34, Ethiopian singer-songwriter (shot)
July 10 – Cosmas Magaya, 67, Zimbabwean mbira musician (COVID-19)
August 27 – Meridjo Belobi, 67, Congolese drummer, former member of Zaïko Langa Langa and inventor of Cavacha
September 21 – Hamdi Benani, 77, Algerian singer and violinist
October 18 – Naâma, 86, Tunisian singer
November 19 – Mshoza, 37, South African kwaito singer

See also 
 2020 in music

References 

Africa
African music
2020 in Africa